Mansfield is an unincorporated community in Henry County, Tennessee, United States.  Its ZIP code is 38236.

Notes

Unincorporated communities in Henry County, Tennessee
Unincorporated communities in Tennessee